Dava railway station was opened in 1864, on the Inverness and Perth Junction Railway, one year after the route was opened.

Station layout 

The station layout was double platform (including passing loop). There was a standard Highland Railway overbridge connecting the platforms, at the north end of the platforms.

Station location 

At 985 feet above sea-level, Dava was the third highest station on the Highland Railway network. The summit that followed south of the station (Dava Summit) reaches 1,052 feet.

The station was located in sparsely populated moorland, along a dirt track near the junction of the A939 and A940 (OS Grid Reference NJ008389).

The surrounding area is wild moorland (The Dava muir).

Closure 

Goods services at Dava were first to end; the date of closure was 27 January 1964. A passenger service continued until 18 October 1965, when the station closed completely.

Remains 

The station building, stationmaster's house, and platforms still remain. The stationmaster's house is a private residence. The standard overbridge no longer exists.

Bus substitution 

No replacement bus services exist to Dava. This remote area has not been served by public transport since the railway closed.

Sources 

"The Highland Railway" - H.A Vallance

Railway stations in Great Britain opened in 1864
Disused railway stations in Moray
Railway stations in Great Britain closed in 1965
Beeching closures in Scotland
Former Highland Railway stations